The Line and Michel Loève International Prize in Probability (Loève Prize) was created in 1992 in honor of Michel Loève by his widow Line.  The prize, awarded every two years, is intended to recognize outstanding contributions by researchers in mathematical probability who are under 45 years old.  With a prize value of around $30,000 this is one of the most generous awards in any specific mathematical subdiscipline.

Winners 

 2021 – Ivan Corwin
 2019 – Allan Sly
 2017 – Hugo Duminil-Copin
 2015 – Alexei Borodin
 2013 – Sourav Chatterjee
 2011 – Scott Sheffield
 2009 – Alice Guionnet
 2007 – Richard Kenyon
 2005 – Wendelin Werner
 2003 – Oded Schramm
 2001 – Yuval Peres
 1999 – Alain-Sol Sznitman
 1997 – Jean-François Le Gall
 1995 – Michel Talagrand
 1993 – David Aldous

See also

 List of mathematics awards

External links

References 

Mathematics awards
Awards established in 1992